Sri Lanka sent a delegation to compete at the 2008 Summer Paralympics in Beijing, People's Republic of China.

Athletics

Powerlifting

Wheelchair tennis

See also
Sri Lanka at the Paralympics
Sri Lanka at the 2008 Summer Olympics

External links
International Paralympic Committee

Nations at the 2008 Summer Paralympics
2008
Summer Paralympics